David Sullivan (born 5 February 1949) is a Welsh businessman and former pornographer. From 1986 to 2007, he owned the Daily Sport and Sunday Sport, which he sold for £40 million.

According to The Sunday Times Rich List in 2019, Sullivan is worth £1.2 billion.

He is the chairman and largest single shareholder of Premier League football team West Ham United F.C., following the death of business partner David Gold in 2023. The pair were previously joint-chairmen of Birmingham City.

Early life
Born in Cardiff, the son of an RAF serviceman, Sullivan grew up living in a Penarth council house. When Sullivan was 10 years old, his father was posted to Aden, Yemen where they lived for a year before moving to England to live in Hornchurch, Essex. He attended the Abbs Cross school and gained ten O Levels. After his family moved to Hertfordshire he attended Watford Grammar School for Boys obtaining three A levels. He then read Economics at Queen Mary College, University of London, narrowly missing a first.

Pornography industry
With his business partner, David Gold, Sullivan's first venture was selling softcore pornographic photos. They expanded into sex shops, adult magazines and several low-budget blue movies, making Sullivan a millionaire by the age of 25. By the late 1970s, he was in control of half of the UK adult magazine market, including major titles such as Playbirds and Whitehouse, 80% of the adult mail order market, and 150 shops.

In the late 1970s, he produced several low-budget British sex movies including Come Play with Me (1977) (directed by Harrison Marks). This was followed by The Playbirds (1978), Confessions from the David Galaxy Affair (1979) and Queen of the Blues (1979), all starring his then-girlfriend Mary Millington. After Millington's suicide in August 1979, he continued trading off of her name with Mary Millington's True Blue Confessions (1980) and Emmanuelle in Soho (1981).

In 1982, Sullivan was convicted of living off immoral earnings of prostitutes. He successfully appealed and was released after serving 71 days in prison. Sullivan said that he did not feel embarrassed about the initial source of his early fortunes. "I've made a lot of people happy," he said. "If I was an arms manufacturer or a cigarette manufacturer, and my products killed millions of my clients, I'd have a bit of doubt about the whole thing. I was a freedom fighter. I believe in the right of adults to make their own decisions."

Property
Sullivan operates an investment company, Conegate, which owns property in London including Russell & Bromley's flagship shopbuildings in Oxford Street near to Bond Street tube station.

Football

Birmingham City
In 1993, Sullivan bought into Birmingham City, with David Gold and Ralph Gold. The landmark deal saw the new owners secure an 80% stake of the Midlands outfit.

In 2007, Sullivan expressed his first desire to sell his share in Birmingham City and openly admitted three reasons for a possible departure. "One, the geographical distance. I've said for years the journey to Birmingham is killing me. Two, I think deep down the public have had enough of us. They think we should have mortgaged our houses to buy more players to compete with Chelsea and Arsenal. The honeymoon is long over and we're at the divorce stage now, unfortunately. And I also feel we've had no support from Birmingham Council."

After 16 years at the club, Birmingham managing director Karren Brady and chairman David Sullivan agreed to step down from their posts on completion of Carson Yeung's takeover in Autumn 2009. The Birmingham manager at the time, Alex McLeish, praised the Sullivan-Gold duo in the media for providing the club with financial stability, stating he respected them a lot for what they had achieved.

West Ham United
On Sullivan's departure from Birmingham, he expressed his intentions to remain in football. Less than one year later in January 2010, he and David Gold acquired a 50% share in West Ham United giving them operational and commercial control and valuing the Premier League club at £105 million. Karren Brady, who had also played a significant role in turning around City's fortunes, joined the Hammers as vice-chairman.

On the day the takeover was confirmed, an emotional Sullivan said: "It's going to take time to sink in. We've been wanting to sit here for 20 years and together we owned 27 per cent of the club 22 years ago and it's taken us 22 years to get to where want to be.
Both me and David are supporters, I went to university here and I lived in Hornchurch. David lived 50 yards from the ground for 20 years of his life and played for West Ham's youth team. We just want to be here where we've always wanted to be. There is no other club we would want to be at so for us we have come home and that's what it's all about."

Within five months the Sullivan and Gold duo pledged a further commitment to the club and on 25 May 2010 they increased their stake to 60% (Sullivan with 30%). Vice-chairman Karren Brady later explained the move gave the football club "the much-needed stability."

In September 2012, Sullivan revealed that together with Gold they were personally funding the club's transfer business. As part of his long-term aspirations for the club, Sullivan backed West Ham's bid to move into the Olympic Stadium in Stratford. On 22 March 2013, West Ham secured a 99-year lease deal, with the stadium planned to be used as their home ground from the 2016–2017 season. In July 2013, Sullivan became the largest single shareholder of West Ham United acquiring a further 25% of shares in the club. In March 2018, there were protests against Sullivan at the London Stadium during a 3–0 home defeat to Burnley. There were four pitch invasions and Sullivan was escorted from his seat before the end of the match. Sullivan was also hit by a coin thrown by one of the supporters.

On 26 March 2018, an HMRC tax tribunal ruled that Sullivan had used West Ham United to avoid paying £700,000 tax for his own family business, Conegate Ltd. Sullivan used Conegate to buy £2m of shares in the holding company that owns West Ham. The same day the shares were converted to "deferred shares", deemed practically worthless and sold back for £1 back to the holding company. Conegate thereby used the £2m loss to reduce its tax bill.

Hornchurch
Hornchurch's season in the Isthmian League Premier Division was suspended in November 2020 due to the COVID-19 pandemic and they were unable to play any league football. During this time they were financially supported by Sullivan who once lived in Hornchurch.

Personal life
Sullivan lives in Birch Hall, near Theydon Bois, Essex. It was built by Ashby and Horner to Sullivan's design in 1992 and set in around 12 acres (49,000 m2) of land, at a cost of £7.5m for the land and building. This is in addition to a commercial property empire worth an estimated £500m. His girlfriend is Ampika Pickston, star of The Real Housewives of Cheshire. Sullivan has two children, David and Jack with ex-girlfriend Emma Benton-Hughes.

Sullivan is a philanthropist and has been a patron of Prostate Cancer UK for over 15 years. He is also an active supporter of the Teenage Cancer Trust along with several other charities nationwide. Sullivan celebrated West Ham's promotion to the Premier League in May 2012 by donating a five figure sum to a charity for children with autism. In October 2020, Sullivan donated £25,000 to help combat child food poverty. His donation was given to FareShare who contribute to the Child Food Poverty Taskforce, founded by Marcus Rashford.

See also
Sport Newspapers
Daily Sport
Sunday Sport

References

Sources
 Simon Sheridan Keeping the British End Up: Four Decades of Saucy Cinema 2011 (fourth edition) (Titan books)
 Simon Sheridan Come Play with Me: The Life and Films of Mary Millington 1999 (FAB Press, Guildford)
 Mark Killick The Sultan of Sleaze 1994 (Penguin UK)

External links

 
Photo of Sullivan

1949 births
Living people
Adult magazine publishers (people)
Alumni of Queen Mary University of London
British newspaper publishers (people)
Welsh pornographers
English football chairmen and investors
People educated at Watford Grammar School for Boys
Businesspeople from Cardiff
21st-century Welsh businesspeople
20th-century Welsh businesspeople
West Ham United F.C. directors and chairmen
Birmingham City F.C. directors and chairmen
British racehorse owners and breeders
Welsh billionaires